Frank Stanton Burns Gavin (October 13, 1890 - March 20, 1938) was an American Anglican priest, theologian, author, journalist and educator. He received his B.A. at the University of Cincinnati in 1912; B.H.L. at Hebrew Union College in 1923; a B.D. at the General Theological Seminary in 1915; and a Th.D. from Harvard University in 1916.

He served as literary editor of The Living Church beginning in 1924, and taught at Nashotah House Theological Seminary and the General Theological Seminary.

The Frank Gavin Liturgical Foundation was established in his memory on May 26, 1944 in New York State, and went on to publish the Anglican Breviary in 1955 and the People's Anglican Missal in the American Edition in 1958.

Select Bibliography 
Aphraates and the Jews: A Study of the Controversial Homilies of the Persian Sage in Their Relation to Jewish Thought (1923)
Some Aspects of Contemporary Greek Orthodox Thought (1923)
The Jewish Antecedents of the Christian Sacraments (1928)
The Catholic Doctrine of Work and Play (1930)
Selfhood and Sacrifice: The Seven Problems of the Atoning Life (1932)
The Resources of the Church (1934)
Seven Centuries of the Problem of Church and State (1938)

References 
An Episcopal Dictionary of the Church

External links 
Bibliographic directory from Project Canterbury

1890 births
1938 deaths
General Theological Seminary alumni
University of Cincinnati alumni
Harvard Divinity School alumni
General Theological Seminary faculty
20th-century American Episcopalians